The following is a list of episodes of the 1980s animated television series M.A.S.K. The series ran for two seasons in 1985 and 1986. No origin episode ever aired. A mini-comic was released with the toys that told the origin of MASK and how Miles Mayhem had a falling out with Matt Trakker and his brother.

Episodes

Season 1 (1985)

Season 2 (1986)

M.A.S.K.